KMXP (96.9 FM) is a commercial hot adult contemporary music radio station in Phoenix, Arizona, owned and operated by iHeartMedia.  Its studios are located in Phoenix near Sky Harbor International Airport and its transmitter is in South Mountain Park.

History
96.9 received its license as KEPI in 1962. Owned by Ward James Atkinson and sold within months to Golden Sounds, Inc., KEPI found it hard to stay on the air. In January 1964, it asked for authority to go silent for up to six months; ultimately, in the time needed to sell the station, it took nine months. When 96.9 returned to the air in October 1964, it was KMEO (later with the FM suffix), broadcasting easy listening music programming as "Cameo", which it held through several different owners. In the late 1980s, the format evolved into an adult contemporary music format. In 1991, it became oldies-formatted "Sunny 97" (KPSN), which would spark a whirlwind of format and callsign changes: on November 28, 1994, it became classic hits KCHT (later KHTC) (first as "96.9 K-Hits FM", then as "The New 96.9 Classic Hits"), then rebranded to KGLQ ("Eagle 96.9") in September 1997. On September 4, 1998, at midnight, after playing "We Will Rock You" and "We Are The Champions" by Queen, KGLQ began stunting with the sound of a ticking clock and liners advising listeners to listen at that time and poking fun at competing radio stations. At 3pm that day, 96.9 adopted its current format, hot adult contemporary, as KMXP “Mix 96.9”. The first song on "Mix" was "New Sensation" by INXS.

HD Radio
Mix 96.9's HD Radio signal is multiplexed.  The main signal is a simulcast of Mix 96.9's hot adult contemporary programming.  The second channel carries iHeartMedia's PRIDE Radio programming for the LGBTQ community featuring a mix of dance and dance-leaning pop music.

Former logo

References

External links

1962 establishments in Arizona
Hot adult contemporary radio stations in the United States
Nationwide Communications
Radio stations established in 1962
MXP
IHeartMedia radio stations